San Paolo Apostolo is a Romanesque architecture, Roman Catholic church and convent located on Via Cavour in the town of Veroli, province of Frosinone, region of Lazio, Italy.

History
A church at the site likely dates from paleo-Christian era; inscriptions at the site link the church to the apostle Paul. A Lombard-Romanesque style church was located here before the year 1000. It was a chapter for canons until the 20th century. The present collegiate church dates from 1804.

References

Churches in the province of Frosinone
Romanesque architecture in Lazio